State Route 222 (SR 222) is a  long north-south state highway in southern West Tennessee. It connects the towns of Somerville and Stanton with Interstate 40 (I-40; Exit 42).

Route description

SR 222 begins in Fayette County north of Somerville at  a Y-Intersection with SR 59. It heads northwest as a two-lane highway through farmland for several miles to an interchange with I-40 (Exit 42). The highway then crosses into Haywood County and temporarily widens to four-lane highway, bypassing the original two-lane alignment to the west, which is now known as Stanton Somerville Road. SR 222 then narrows to two-lanes and enters Stanton as Lafayette Street, where it passes through some neighborhoods before coming to an end at an intersection with US 70/US 79/SR 1 just west of downtown.

Major intersections

References

222
Transportation in Fayette County, Tennessee
Transportation in Haywood County, Tennessee